Elizabeth of Denmark

Isabella of Austria (1501–1526), wife of Christian II of Denmark
Elizabeth of Denmark, Electress of Brandenburg (1485–1555), daughter of John of Denmark and wife of Joachim I Nestor, Elector of Brandenburg
Elizabeth of Denmark, Duchess of Mecklenburg (1524–1586), daughter of Frederick I of Denmark and wife of Magnus III, Duke of Mecklenburg-Schwerin and later Ulrich, Duke of Mecklenburg
Elizabeth of Denmark, Duchess of Brunswick-Wolfenbüttel (1573–1626), daughter of Frederick II of Denmark and wife of Henry Julius, Duke of Brunswick-Wolfenbüttel
Princess Elisabeth of Denmark (1935–2018), daughter of Knud, Hereditary Prince of Denmark
Princess Isabella of Denmark (b. 2007), daughter of Frederik, Crown Prince of Denmark